La viuda negra may refer to:

La viuda negra (film), a 1977 Mexican film starring Isela Vega and Mario Almada
La viuda negra (2014 telenovela)